The surname Babnik belongs to about 700 persons in Slovenia.

The surname may refer to:

 Gabriela Babnik (born 1979), Slovene writer, literary critic and translator
 Mary Babnik Brown (1907–1991), an American citizen who became known for having donated her hair to the United States military during World War II
 Aleš Babnik, Slovenian national badminton champion

References 

Slovene-language surnames